Teramiranda Airport  was a privately owned, public use airport in Delaware County, Oklahoma, United States. It is located on Monkey Island, a peninsula on the northern shore of Grand Lake o' the Cherokees. The airport is seven nautical miles (13 km) southeast of the central business district of Afton, a city in Ottawa County, Oklahoma. , the airport was permanently closed.

Facilities and aircraft 
Teramiranda Airport covers an area of 40 acres (16 ha) at an elevation of 793 feet (242 m) above mean sea level. It has one runway designated 18/36 with turf surface measuring 2,580 by 35 feet (786 x 11 m). For the 12-month period ending September 11, 2007, the airport had 100 general aviation aircraft operations, an average of 8 per month.

See also 
 Grand Lake Regional Airport

References

External links 
 Aerial image as of February 1995 from USGS The National Map

Defunct airports in Oklahoma
Buildings and structures in Delaware County, Oklahoma
Transportation in Delaware County, Oklahoma